Umarizal is a microregion in the Brazilian state of Rio Grande do Norte.

Municipalities 
The microregion consists of the following municipalities:
Almino Afonso
Antônio Martins
Frutuoso Gomes
João Dias
Lucrécia
Martins
Olho-d'Água do Borges
Patu
Rafael Godeiro
Serrinha dos Pintos
Umarizal

References

Microregions of Rio Grande do Norte